In statistics, Stein's unbiased risk estimate (SURE) is an unbiased estimator of the mean-squared error of "a nearly arbitrary, nonlinear biased estimator."  In other words, it provides an indication of the accuracy of a given estimator. This is important since the true mean-squared error of an estimator is a function of the unknown parameter to be estimated, and thus cannot be determined exactly.
 
The technique is named after its discoverer, Charles Stein.

Formal statement 
Let  be an unknown parameter and let  be a measurement vector whose components are independent and distributed normally with mean  and variance . Then, Stein's unbiased risk estimate is given by

with

Thus, minimizing SURE can act as a surrogate for minimizing the MSE. Note that there is no dependence on the unknown parameter  in the expression for SURE above.

Proof 
We wish to show that 
 
We start by expanding the MSE as
 
Now we use  integration by parts to rewrite the last term:

Substituting this into the expression for the MSE, we arrive at

Applications 
A standard application of SURE is to choose a parametric form for an estimator, and then optimize the values of the parameters to minimize the risk estimate. This technique has been applied in several settings. For example, a variant of the James–Stein estimator can be derived by finding the optimal shrinkage estimator. The technique has also been used by Donoho and Johnstone to determine the optimal shrinkage factor in a wavelet denoising setting.

References 

Point estimation performance